Charlotte Reinhardt (born 25th November 1993) is a German rower who competes in international level events. She is a double World bronze medalist and a European champion, she competes in coxless four and eight.

References

1993 births
Living people
Sportspeople from Dortmund
German female rowers
20th-century German women
21st-century German women